Tukalbad (also Romanized as Tūḵlābād) is a village in Pas Kalut Rural District, in the Central District of Gonabad County, Razavi Khorasan Province, Iran. At the 2006 census, its population was 28, in 9 families.

References 

Populated places in Gonabad County